Lair Geraldo Theodoro Ribeiro, MD, FACC (born July 6, 1945) is a Brazilian cardiologist, nutrologist, self-help and physician writer. He is the author of more than 100 scientific publications.

Career 
Lair had the opportunity to live in the United States for 17 years where he worked at three American universities, Harvard Medical School, Baylor College of Medicine and Thomas Jefferson University. 

He has written more than 38 books, of which 15 are considered best sellers. Twenty-six of his books about self-awareness and medical science have been translated into other languages, and are available in more than 40 countries. His book "Success is no accident" has achieved best-seller status in Brazil. In 2021, he published the book "Cancer – another vision" (Câncer – uma outra visão).

He is an advocate of pseudosciences and alternative medicine as neuro-linguistic programming, coconut oil to cure cancer and miracle mineral supplement. During the COVID-19 pandemic he recommended the use of chloroquine and ozone therapy.

He is currently delivering lectures and workshops around the world on personal and professional development and courses for health professionals specialized in nutrition and bioidentical hormones. He is the coordinator and main professor of  the Post-Graduate Course “lato sensu” at Uningá (University Center Uningá) entitled: “NUTRITIONAL ADEQUACY AND MAINTENANCE OF HOMEOSTASIS – PREVENTION AND TREATMENT OF DISEASES RELATED TO AGING.”

References

1945 births
Alternative cancer treatment advocates
Brazilian cardiologists
Brazilian writers
Living people
Pseudoscientific diet advocates
Neuro-linguistic programming writers
People in alternative medicine